Sylvano Dominique Comvalius (born 10 August 1987) is a retired Dutch professional footballer who played as a forward.

Club career
At Birkirkara, Comvalius became the club's top scorer and won the Maltese Premier League.

On 1 October 2010, he signed a short-term deal with Scottish First Division side Stirling Albion. In January 2011, he moved to Al-Salmiya SC in Kuwait. In June 2011, he joined Kazakh club FC Atyrau, where countryman Kiran Bechan already played.

He transferred to China League One club Fujian Smart Hero in March 2012. He then spent a year with Regionalliga Südwest side Eintracht Trier, and was transferred to Dynamo Dresden of the 3. Liga in 2014. He later played for Hessen Kassel and Ukrainian side Stal Kamianske.

In March 2017, he joined Bali United on a one year-contract, to team up with an old friend from Ajax, Irfan Bachdim. The 2017 season was a productive one for Comvalius as he plundered a record 37 goals in 34 games to help his team finish second.

After his impact in the Indonesian league and a short stint in Thailand, he moved to Malaysia in December 2018 to join Malaysia club KLFA but he decline his contract for 2019 season.

Comvalius signed for Singapore Premier League side, Geylang International, for the 2021 Singapore Premier League season; citing playing in Singapore as a part of his bucket list.

Personal life
Comvalius is of Surinamese descent through his father.

Career statistics

Honours

Birkirkara
 Maltese Premier League: 2009–10

Eintracht Trier
 Rhineland Cup: 2013–14

Individual
 Liga 1 Top Goalscorer: 2017
 Liga 1 Best XI: 2017

References

External links
 Sylvano Comvalius at Dutch Players Abroad
 
 

1987 births
Living people
Footballers from Amsterdam
Dutch footballers
Dutch sportspeople of Surinamese descent
Association football forwards
AFC Ajax players
Almere City FC players
Quick Boys players
Ħamrun Spartans F.C. players
Birkirkara F.C. players
Stirling Albion F.C. players
Al Salmiya SC players
FC Atyrau players
Cangzhou Mighty Lions F.C. players
SV Eintracht Trier 05 players
Dynamo Dresden players
KSV Hessen Kassel players
FC Stal Kamianske players
Bali United F.C. players
Eerste Divisie players
Scottish Football League players
China League One players
3. Liga players
Ukrainian Premier League players
Dutch expatriate footballers
Expatriate footballers in Malta
Expatriate footballers in Scotland
Expatriate footballers in Kuwait
Expatriate footballers in Kazakhstan
Expatriate footballers in China
Expatriate footballers in Germany
Expatriate footballers in Ukraine
Expatriate footballers in Indonesia
Dutch expatriate sportspeople in Malta
Dutch expatriate sportspeople in Scotland
Dutch expatriate sportspeople in Kuwait
Dutch expatriate sportspeople in Kazakhstan
Dutch expatriate sportspeople in China
Dutch expatriate sportspeople in Germany
Dutch expatriate sportspeople in Ukraine
Dutch expatriate sportspeople in Indonesia
Kuwait Premier League players